The Basilica of the Transfiguration of Our Lord (also called Prüm Basilica) is a Catholic church in the West Eifel, Germany, and a papal minor basilica dedicated to the Holy Savior and the Transfiguration of Christ. Formerly, it was the abbey church of the old abbey of Prüm,  founded by the Benedictine order. It depends on the bishopric of Trier.

Balthasar Neumann,  and Pablo Kurz were architects from different backgrounds with different skills who worked on it. It can be seen that the construction of the abbey no longer presents the dynamic form of Neumann's early works, since it was later realized, despite its northern façade is one of the best in the Eifel region or the entire region of the Rhine. While in other impressive monastery regions were built, in the region of Trier between 1676 and 1729 years no important monument was made.

See also
Roman Catholicism in Germany
Transfiguration of Our Lord

References

Basilica churches in Germany
Roman Catholic churches completed in 1721
Roman Catholic churches in Rhineland-Palatinate
18th-century Roman Catholic church buildings in Germany